The women's individual at the 2016 UIPM Senior World Championships was held on 25 & 27 May 2016.

Qualification
On 25 May 2016, 36 competitors qualified for the final as described below:

The top 8 total scores in each group qualify by right; the top 12 total scores across the remainder of the field also qualify. Competitors do not perform the riding discipline during qualification.

Group A

Group B

Group C

Final
The final was held on 27 May 2016.

Team standings
Standings are determined by the sum of three scores for each country, whether or not their respective competitors qualified for the final.

References

External links
Results

2016 World Modern Pentathlon Championships